Trokyap (Tibetan: khro skyabs) or Chuosi was a Gyalrong Tibetan kingdom located in today's southern Zamthang County and north of Jinchuan County of Ngawa Tibetan and Qiang Autonomous Prefecture in western Sichuan Province of China. It was one of the 18 Gyalrong kingdoms. In 1700, it submitted to the Qing rule and its leader received the title "Pacification Commissioner" (Anfusi, 安抚司). It regained autonomy after the Xinhai Revolution in 1912. In the late 1930s, the nationalist Kuomintang government placed it under Xikang jurisdiction. The kingdom is abolished by the Chinese Government in 1952.

References

History of Sichuan
Kham
States and territories disestablished in 1952